The Rang Ghar , (Assamese: ৰংঘৰ, rong ghor meaning "House of Entertainment") is a two-storeyed building which once served as the royal sports-pavilion where Ahom kings and nobles were spectators at games like buffalo fights and other sports at Rupahi Pathar (pathar meaning "field" in Assamese) - particularly during the Rongali Bihu festival in the Ahom capital of Rangpur.

Situated by the side of the Assam Trunk Road, it lies to the northeast of the Rangpur Palace, a seven-storied royal complex comprising the Talatal Ghar and the Kareng Ghar.

History
Said to be one of the oldest surviving amphitheaters in Asia, the building was first constructed during the reign of Swargadeo Rudra Singha with bamboo and wood. It was later rebuilt with brick by Swargadeo Pramatta Singha in 1744–1751 A.D.

Architecture
The roof of the Rang Ghar is shaped like an inverted royal Ahom long boat. The base of the monument has a series of arched entrances, while atop the roof sits a decorative pair of carved stone crocodiles.

Many of the arched entrances have retained little more than their brick framework, with mere vestiges of sculptural adornments here and there. The Ahoms, who used special, thin, baked bricks, did not use cement but a paste of rice and eggs as mortar for their construction, a pulse called Maati Maah and a fish named Borali Mach in Assamese. They also made use of powdered mixed lime and bricks to cover the surface of the inner walls. It is said that this layer of powder used to keep the inside of the Rang Ghar cool.

The adjoining field, known as Rupohi Pothar, wore a festive look when games like bull-fight, cock-fight, elephant fight, wrestling, etc., were held on different occasions during the Ahom rule. Rang Ghar, besides standing as the royal pavilion, also contributed in spreading the games to different parts of the kingdom and its neighbouring States.

About a kilometer to the northeast of the Rang Ghar is the Joysagar Pukhuri. This is a man-made tank, encompassing an area of about 120 bighas of land. It was dug in memory of Joymoti Konwari, mother of Rudra Singha (1665 – 1714)  - the most illustrious of the Ahom kings.

Architectural Influence of the Rang Ghar
 The entrance to the Srimanta Sankaradeva Kalakshetra at Guwahati echoes the Rang Ghar.
 The Rang Ghar was the logo of the 33rd National Games held in Guwahati, in February 2007.

Present condition
Frequent earthquakes and seismic surveys being undertaken by the Oil and Natural Gas Corporation are posing a threat to Assam's 18th century amphitheatre Rang Ghar. At least 35 cracks have been noticed at various places on the walls of the historic Rang Ghar.

Gallery

See also 
 Ahom Dynasty
 Kareng Ghar, Garhgaon
 Talatal Ghar, Sivasagar
 Sivasagar district

References

A comprehensive History Of Assam by S.L. Baruah. Page 293

External links

Rang Ghar 
National Games logo
Rangghar: the oldest amphitheatre in Asia

Buildings and structures in Assam
Tourist attractions in Assam
Monuments and memorials in India
Ahom kingdom
Sports venues completed in 1746
Sivasagar district
Cultural history of Assam